The Cologne Centurions were an American football team that played in NFL Europe. The Centurions began competing in the league in the 2004 season, having replaced the defunct Barcelona Dragons. They played their home games at RheinEnergieStadion in Cologne.

The Centurions' first-ever game was against local rival Rhein Fire. Cologne lost 25–26. The Centurions' inaugural season finished with a 4–6 record.

On 21 February 2006, the Centurions named David Duggan as their new head coach. He replaced Darryl Sims, who was on the verge of his first season in the position but instead was pursuing an opportunity in the NFL. Peter Vaas, a two-time World Bowl-winning coach with the Berlin Thunder, had occupied the job in the team's first two seasons. The Centurions were the only NFL Europe team that never won a World Bowl.

An unrelated team of the same name is to play in the inaugural 2021 season of the new European League of Football

Season-by-season

Head coaches

References

External links
 The Football Database

 
NFL Europe (WLAF) teams
Centurions
Defunct American football teams in Germany
American football teams established in 2004
American football teams disestablished in 2007
2004 establishments in Germany
2007 disestablishments in Germany